is a Japanese photographer.

References

Further reading
Kaku: Hangenki (核：半減期) The Half Life of Awareness: Photographs of Hiroshima and Nagasaki. Tokyo: Tokyo Metropolitan Museum of Photography, 1995.  Exhibition catalogue; text in Japanese and English. Photographers: Ken Domon, Toshio Fukada, Kikujirō Fukushima, Shigeo Hayashi, Kenji Ishiguro, Shunkichi Kikuchi, Mitsugi Kishida, Yoshito Matsushige, Eiichi Matsumoto, Shōmei Tōmatsu, Hiromi Tsuchida and Yōsuke Yamahata).

Japanese photographers
1928 births
Possibly living people
Place of birth missing (living people)